Q'illu Salli (Quechua q'illu yellow, salli sulfur, "yellow sulfur", also spelled Khellu Salli) is a  mountain in the Andes of Bolivia. It is situated in the Potosí Department, Sud Lípez Province, San Pablo de Lípez Municipality. Q'illu  Salli lies south-east of San Pablo de Lípez, south-west of the mountain Kuntur Wasi and south of the river Lluch'a Mayu (Llucha Mayu).

References 

Mountains of Potosí Department